John Campion may refer to:
 John Joseph Campion, Irish-American entrepreneur
 John Campion (politician), English politician and police and crime commissioner
 John F. Campion, mine-owner in Leadville, Colorado

See also
 John Champion (disambiguation)